This list of tallest buildings in Chittagong enumerates high-rises in Chittagong, Bangladesh. Chittagong is one of the major cities in Bangladesh.At present there are over 14 high-rise buildings in the city which is second highest in Bangladesh. Chittagong has numerous high-rise buildings, both residential and commercial. Hundreds of high-rises are already constructed in the city.

Tallest buildings

This lists ranks buildings in Chittagong based on their official height. All the buildings listed below rise at least  from the ground. They are either completed or Topped-out. An equals sign (=) following a rank indicates the same height between two or more buildings. The "Year" column indicates the year in which a building was completed.

Buildings above 60m

* Indicates still under construction, but has been topped-out

Under construction, proposed and approved 
This list features buildings that are currently in under construction, proposed and approved in the city. All the buildings listed below stand at least 20 floors.

See also
 List of tallest buildings in Bangladesh
 List of tallest buildings in Dhaka
List of tallest buildings in Sylhet
 List of tallest buildings and structures in South Asia
 List of tallest buildings in Asia
 List of tallest buildings in the World
 List of tallest structures in the world

References

Buildings and structures in Chittagong
Chittagong
Chittagong-related lists
Chittagong